Steven Robinson ASE is an Australian film editor, who works on cinema and television projects, notable for his editing on the Kath & Kim comedy series and the feature film Kath & Kimderella (2012).

He has won multiple awards, including two AFI Awards awards for Best Editing on the feature documentaries In the Shadow of the Hill (2016) and Inside the Firestorm (2010), and Best Editing at the Australian Screen Editors Awards for Choir of Hard Knocks (2007). He has been nominated ten times for Best Editing at the Australian Screen Editors Awards.

Other significant credits include:
"In the Shadow of the Hill" Winner Best Australian Documentary Sydney Film Festival 2016
 Putuparri and the Rainmakers (feature documentary) Winner First Prize CinefestOz 2015 
 First Contact (factual series) Winner Most Outstanding Factual Program Logies 2015
 Sperm Donors Anonymous, (documentary film) 
 It's a Date  ""Whatever Happened to that Guy"; "Driven Crazy" (comedy series)
 M.D.A. (drama series) winner Best Drama Series AFI Awards 2003
 The Ball (documentary) Nominated Best Documentary AFI Awards 2012
 Choir of Hard Knocks (factual series) Winner Most Outstanding Factual Program Logies 2007
"The Trial","Gallipoli from Above","Charles Bean's Great War","The Art of Bill Henson" (documentaries)
Silver Sun" , "Bed of Roses", "The Magistrate" "Neighbours" (drama series)
"Something in the Air" (drama series) Winner Best Episode in a Drama Series AFI Awards 2002
"Da Kath & Kim Code" (television feature film)
"Frank & Jerry" (independent comedy feature film)
"DNA Nation", "The Family", "Penguin Island", "Outback House""Dirty Business: How mining made Australia" (documentary series)

External links

References

Australian film editors
Living people
Year of birth missing (living people)